Epostane (INN, USAN, BAN) (developmental code name WIN-32729) is an inhibitor of 3β-hydroxysteroid dehydrogenase (3β-HSD) that was developed as a contraceptive, abortifacient, and oxytocic drug but was never marketed. By inhibiting 3β-HSD, epostane blocks the biosynthesis of progesterone from pregnenolone (and also the conversion of dehydroepiandrosterone to androstenedione), thereby functioning as an antiprogestogen and terminating pregnancy. The drug was trialed and in a study was found to be slightly more effective at inducing abortion relative to mifepristone.

See also
 Nisterime
 Trilostane

References

3β-Hydroxysteroid dehydrogenase inhibitors
Androstanes
Antiprogestogens
Nitriles
Epoxides
1-Methylcyclopentanols
Enols
Cyclohexenols
Sterols